Dolls is a 2007 Czech drama film directed by Karin Babinská.

Synopsis 
During summer holidays, four teenagers, three girls and a boy, in search of sexual experiences and excesses of all kinds, decide to join Amsterdam by hitchhiking. Their personalities will be revealed, and the introverted Iska will choose to openly assume the desire she feels for her best friend Karolína.

Production 
 Title : Dolls
 Original title : Pusinky
 Director : Karin Babinská
 Scenario : Karin Babinská and Petra Uselova
 Sound : Dolby Digital
 Language : Czech
 Duration : 90 minutes
 Filming location : Czech Republic
 Release date : 5 April 2007
 Country : Czech Republic

Casting 
  : Karolína
 Marie Doležalová : Iska
  : Vendula
 Filip Blažek : Marek
 Lenka Vlasáková : Hanka
  : Vojta
 Erik Kalivoda : Bobr
 Mário Kubas : Vrbar
 Matěj Ruppert : Bedas

Awards 
 2007 Finále Plzeň award

External links 
 
 Pusinky on The Encyclopedia of Lesbian Movie Scenes

2007 films
2007 drama films
Czech LGBT-related films
Golden Kingfisher winners
Czech drama road movies
2000s drama road movies
2007 LGBT-related films
LGBT-related drama films
Lesbian-related films
2000s Czech-language films
2000s Czech films